Peter Okodogbe (born 27 May 1958) is a former sprinter from Nigeria who specialised in the 100 and 200 metres.

In 1978 he won a silver medal at the All Africa Games. In 1980 Okodogbe competed at the Summer Olympics in Moscow, where he ran in the 100/200 metres, and reached the semi-finals of both events. He also ran in the sprint relay which finished 7th in the final.

External links
sports-reference

1958 births
Nigerian male sprinters
Olympic athletes of Nigeria
Athletes (track and field) at the 1980 Summer Olympics
Living people
African Games silver medalists for Nigeria
African Games medalists in athletics (track and field)
Athletes (track and field) at the 1978 All-Africa Games
20th-century Nigerian people